House of the Long Shadows is a 1983 British comedy horror film directed by Pete Walker. It is notable because four iconic horror film stars (Vincent Price, Christopher Lee, Peter Cushing and John Carradine) are together in one feature. The screenplay by Michael Armstrong is based on the 1913 novel Seven Keys to Baldpate by Earl Derr Biggers, which was also adapted into a famous play that gave birth in turn to several films.

Plot summary
Kenneth Magee (Desi Arnaz, Jr.), a young writer, bets his publisher (Richard Todd) $20,000 that he can write a novel of the caliber of Wuthering Heights in 24 hours. To get in the mood for the undertaking, he goes to a deserted Welsh manor. Upon his arrival, however, Magee discovers that Bllyddpaetwr Manor is not as empty as he was told. Still there are Lord Grisbane (Carradine) and his daughter, Victoria (Sheila Keith), who have been maintaining the mansion on their own. As the stormy night progresses, more people come to the mansion, including Lord Grisbane's sons Lionel (Price) and Sebastian (Cushing), Magee's publisher's secretary, Mary Norton (Julie Peasgood), and Corrigan (Lee), a potential buyer of the property.

After much coaxing, the Grisbanes reveal that they are here to release their brother, Roderick, who was imprisoned in his room for 40 years because he seduced a village girl when he was 14 and killed her when he found out she was pregnant. When they go to release him, they find the room empty and conclude that he broke out recently by breaking the bars in front of the window. Moments later, Lord Grisbane has a fatal heart attack. As Magee talks about getting the police, screams are heard and they find Victoria strangled to death. When Corrigan, Magee, and Mary decide to leave, they discover all of their cars have slashed tires. Soon, Diana (Louise English) and Andrew (Richard Hunter), a young couple who Magee met at the train station, arrive seeking shelter from the storm. They are soon killed when Diane washes her face with water that has been replaced by acid and Andrew drinks poisoned punch. The remaining five decide to find Roderick and kill him before he kills them.

Magee, Sebastian, and Mary search a series of tunnels behind a bookcase. During their search, they get separated and Sebastian is hanged to death from the ceiling. Mary makes it back to Corrigan and Lionel while Magee remains lost in the tunnels. Corrigan soon reveals that he, in fact, is Roderick and that he escaped his prison decades ago, but returns every now and then to make them think he was still trapped. He then proceeds to kill Lionel with a battle axe and chase Mary throughout the manor. Magee soon finds them and, after the ensuing fight, knocks Roderick down the stairs; during the fall, Roderick accidentally stabs himself with the axe. As Roderick is dying, his victims suddenly walk into the room, very much alive; it is revealed that all was a joke put on by Magee's publisher, even Roderick rises, his wound also a fake.

It is revealed that it was all Magee's story, as he finishes his novel and returns to give it to his publisher. When his publisher gives him his $20,000 he proceeds to rip it up, as he has learned that some things are more important than money.

Cast
Vincent Price as Lionel Grisbane
Christopher Lee as Corrigan/Roderick Grisbane
Peter Cushing as Sebastian Grisbane
Desi Arnaz, Jr. as Kenneth Magee
John Carradine as Lord Elijah Grisbane
Sheila Keith as Victoria Grisbane
Julie Peasgood as Mary Norton
Richard Todd as Sam Allyson
Louise English as Diana Caulder 
Richard Hunter as Andrew Caulder 
Norman Rossington as Station Master

Production

Filming location
The film was shot at Rotherfield Park, a manor house in rural Hampshire, England.

Music
The original music score was composed by Richard Harvey.

Release
House of the Long Shadows was released on June 17, 1983.

Critical response
In a contemporary review, Kim Newman (Monthly Film Bulletin) stated that the main selling point of the film was the return of these particular horror actors, which in turn became a "major surprise, and disappointment, in that the film should waste these Grand Old Icons on an entirely superfluous remake of Seven Keys to Baldpate" The review states that, along with the producers' film The Wicked Lady, their work was long out of date and that the "preposterous twist ending" that showed "Armstrong and Walker display an appalling contempt for the audience", and that the ending turned "a disappointing project into an infuriating one."

References

External links 

1983 horror films
1983 films
British comedy horror films
1980s comedy horror films
Films about writers
Films directed by Pete Walker
Golan-Globus films
British independent films
1980s mystery films
Films based on horror novels
Films set in country houses
Films set in Wales
Films shot in Hampshire
British haunted house films
Films based on American novels
Films based on Seven Keys to Baldpate
Films scored by Richard Harvey
1983 comedy films
Films produced by Menahem Golan
Films produced by Yoram Globus
1980s English-language films
1980s British films